U.S. Kids Golf is a United States-based company specializing in serving young players in the sport of golf. Founded in 1996, U.S. Kids Golf has both an LLC component and a Foundation side, and the two operate the four main pillars of its core business: 1.) Equipment 2.) Tournaments 3.) Coaches Institute 4.) Longleaf Golf & Family Club. The for-profit business side is headquartered in Peachtree Corners, Georgia while the Foundation headquarters is located in Pinehurst, North Carolina.

Mission Statement:

The mission statement of U.S. Kids Golf reads: To help kids have fun learning the lifelong game of golf and to encourage family interactions that builds lasting memories.

History 
U.S. Kids Golf was founded in 1997 by Dan Van Horn. Van Horn, a former golf professional and engineering major, was inspired to create a line of lighter golf clubs after taking his son to a local golf course and realizing he was having trouble getting the ball up in the air while using a cut down adult golf club. By removing some weight from the back of the club, he saw immediate results in his son's golf swing, and subsequent, enjoyment level of playing. The idea has grown into the largest kids golf organization in the world.

 In 2000, U.S. Kids Golf held its first World Championship for Kids in Jekyll Island, Georgia. 
 In 2001, U.S. Kids Golf established the U.S. Kids Golf Foundation, a non-profit division dedicated to serving families through teaching golf and hosting competitive events.
 In 2002, Local Tours for kids were started, with the first being staged in Atlanta, Georgia. Also that year, the World Championship was moved to Williamsburg, Virginia.  
 In 2004, U.S. Kids Golf established its first Top 50 Kids Coaches award. 
 In 2005, the first U.S. Kids Golf Teen World Championship was held in Naples, Florida and the World Championship was moved to Pinehurst, North Carolina.  In 2008, both events were staged in Pinehurst where they remain to this day.
 In 2012, the U.S. Kids Golf Coaches Institute was founded with the idea to train coaches interested in focusing on junior golf instruction with best practices and continuing education.
 In 2015, the U.S. Kids Golf Foundation purchased Longleaf Golf & Country Club in Southern Pines, NC in an effort to better learn the business challenges and industry needs from the golf course perspective. The name was changed to Longleaf Golf & Family Club with the intent of being a “Living Lab” for best practices in how to serve current players, members, parents, and kids being introduced to the game. As part of this goal, U.S. Kids Golf established the first U.S. Kids Golf Academy on the site, creating a premier learning environment for new players. Beginning with zero students in a highly competitive market, the academy soon grew to over 400 kids within 3 years of operation.
 In 2018, the National Golf Foundation cited U.S. Kids Golf as one of the Top 100 Businesses in Golf. The biannual award was also given to U.S. Kids Golf in 2020.
 In 2022, Golf Business Magazine wrote "no company in golf has done more to grow the game than U.S. Kids Golf. In fact, it's not close."

References

External links
 U.S. Kids Golf Homepage

Golf associations
Amateur golf
Junior golf
Sports organizations established in 1996
Sports organizations of the United States